The following is a summary of the Classic 100 Mozart survey conducted by the ABC Classic FM radio station during 2006.

Survey summary

See also
Wolfgang Amadeus Mozart
Classic 100 Countdowns

References

Official ABC Classic FM Classic 100 Mozart site

Classic 100 Countdowns (ABC)
2006 in Australian music